Dennys Quiñonez (born March 12, 1992) is an Ecuadorian football midfielder. He currently plays for Olmedo of the Ecuador Serie A.

Club career
Quiñonez rose in the youth ranks of Barcelona and is considered a future prospect. Quiñonez has been a regular starter since the 2010 season along with others Barcelona's future prospect like Brayan de la Torre and Christian Cruz.

International career
Quiñonez is a member and captain of the Ecuador Under-20 national team. On February 12, 2011 the Ecuador Under-20 
qualify to the 2011 FIFA U-20 World Cup.
Quiñonez got his first senior cap on April 21, 2011 against Argentina.

References

External links
FEF Player card

1992 births
Living people
Sportspeople from Guayaquil
Association football midfielders
Ecuadorian footballers
Ecuador international footballers
Ecuadorian Serie A players
Barcelona S.C. footballers
C.D. El Nacional footballers
S.D. Quito footballers
S.D. Aucas footballers
L.D.U. Portoviejo footballers
C.D. Cuenca footballers
C.D. Olmedo footballers
Footballers at the 2011 Pan American Games
Pan American Games competitors for Ecuador